The Vau i Dejës Hydroelectric Power Station is a hydroelectric dam on the Drin River, in Albania, near Vau i Dejës.

See also 

 List of power stations in Albania

References 

Hydroelectric power stations in Albania
Dams completed in 1973
Buildings and structures in Vau i Dejës